She Loves You is an album by Japanese singer Misato Watanabe. It was released on July 15, 1995 by Sony Music Entertainment.

Track listings

Sekai de Ichiban Toi Basho (The farthest place in the world)
My Revolution
Summertime Blues
Niji wo Mitakai (Have you ever seen the Rainbow?) (Tokyo Mix)
Yarujan Onna-no-ko (Good going, Girls)
Sakura no Hana no Saku koro ni (When Cherry Blossoms bloom)
Natsu ga Kita! (Summer has come!)
Sincerely [Sincerely]
Itsuka Kitto (Someday, surely)
Tobe Mokei Hikouki (Fly, Model Aircraft)
Koi sitatte Ii janai (Love as I want to)
BELIEVE
Manatsu no Santakurosu (Midsummer's Santa Claus)
Aozora (Blue Sky)
eyes
10 years

External links
Sony Music Entertainment - Official site for Watanabe Misato. 
Album Page - Direct link to page with song listing and music samples.

1995 albums
Misato Watanabe albums